A DevOps toolchain is a set or combination of tools that aid in the delivery, development, and management of software applications throughout the systems development life cycle, as coordinated by an organisation that uses DevOps practices.

Generally, DevOps tools fit into one or more activities, which supports specific DevOps initiatives: Plan, Create, Verify, Package, Release, Configure, Monitor, and Version Control.

Toolchains 
In software, a toolchain is the set of programming tools that is used to perform a complex software development task or to create a software product, which is typically another computer program or a set of related programs.  In general, the tools forming a toolchain are executed consecutively so the output or resulting environment state of each tool becomes the input or starting environment for the next one, but the term is also used when referring to a set of related tools that are not necessarily executed consecutively.

As DevOps is a set of practices that emphasizes the collaboration and communication of both software developers and other information technology (IT) professionals, while automating the process of software delivery and infrastructure changes, its implementation can include the definition of the series of tools used at various stages of the lifecycle; because DevOps is a cultural shift and collaboration between development and operations, there is no one product that can be considered a single DevOps tool. Instead a collection of tools, potentially from a variety of vendors, are used in one or more stages of the lifecycle.

Stages of DevOps

Plan
Plan is composed of two things: "define" and "plan". This activity refers to the business value and application requirements. Specifically "Plan" activities include:
Production metrics, objects and feedback 
 Requirements
 Business metrics 
 Update release metrics 
 Release plan, timing and business case 
 Security policy and requirement
A combination of the IT personnel will be involved in these activities: business application owners, software development, software architects, continual release management, security officers and the organization responsible for managing the production of IT infrastructure.

Create
Create is composed of the building, coding, and configuring of the software development process. The specific activities are:
Design of the software and configuration 
Coding including code quality and performance 
Software build and build performance 
Release candidate

Tools and vendors in this category often overlap with other categories. Because DevOps is about breaking down silos, this is reflective in the activities and product solutions.

Verify
Verify is directly associated with ensuring the quality of the software release; activities designed to ensure code quality is maintained and the highest quality is deployed to production.  The main activities in this are:
 Acceptance testing
 Regression testing 
 Security and vulnerability analysis
 Performance 
 Configuration testing

Solutions for verify related activities generally fall under four main categories: Test automation, Static analysis, Test Lab, and Security.

Packaging
Packaging refers to the activities involved once the release is ready for deployment, often also referred to as staging or Preproduction / "preprod". This often includes tasks and activities such as:
Approval/preapprovals 
Package configuration
Triggered releases 
Release staging and holding

Release
Release related activities include schedule, orchestration, provisioning and deploying software into production and targeted environment. The specific Release activities include:
Release coordination
Deploying and promoting applications 
Fallbacks and recovery 
Scheduled/timed releases

Solutions that cover this aspect of the toolchain include application release automation, deployment automation and release management.

Configure
Configure activities fall under the operation side of DevOps. Once software is deployed, there may be additional IT infrastructure provisioning and configuration activities required. 
Specific activities including:
Infrastructure storage, database and network provisioning and configuring 
Application provision and configuration.

The main types of solutions that facilitate these activities are continuous configuration automation, configuration management, and infrastructure as code tools.

Monitor
Monitoring is an important link in a DevOps toolchain. It allows IT organization to identify specific issues of specific releases and to understand the impact on end-users. A summary of Monitor related activities are:
Performance of IT infrastructure
End-user response and experience
Production metrics and statistics

Information from monitoring activities often impacts Plan activities required for changes and for new release cycles.

Version Control
Version Control is an important link in a DevOps toolchain and a component of software configuration management. Version Control is the management of changes to documents, computer programs, large web sites, and other collections of information. A summary of Version Control related activities are:
Non-linear development
Distributed development
Compatibility with existent systems and protocols
Toolkit-based design

Information from Version Control often supports Release activities required for changes and for new release cycles.

See also
Continuous delivery
Continuous integration
Agile software development
WinOps

References

Software design
Software development process
Programming tools